Rolando Chang (born 6 March 1946) is a Cuban weightlifter. He competed in the men's featherweight event at the 1972 Summer Olympics.

References

1946 births
Living people
Cuban male weightlifters
Olympic weightlifters of Cuba
Weightlifters at the 1972 Summer Olympics
Sportspeople from Guantánamo
Pan American Games medalists in weightlifting
Pan American Games gold medalists for Cuba
Pan American Games bronze medalists for Cuba
Weightlifters at the 1971 Pan American Games
20th-century Cuban people
21st-century Cuban people